Ijima's leaf warbler (Phylloscopus ijimae) (also known as Izu leaf warbler, Ijima's willow warbler or Ijima's warbler) is a species of Old World warbler in the family Phylloscopidae. The species is native to Japan, where it has been designated a Natural Monument under the 1950 Law for the Protection of Cultural Properties, with records also from Taiwan and the Philippines.

Taxonomy

Initially given the scientific name Acanthopneuste ijimae by Stejneger,  followed suit in a 1923 paper on the birds of Izu Ōshima. In a 1926 paper on a collection of birds from the Ryūkyū Islands, Kuroda Nagamichi treated the warbler instead as a subspecies of the western crowned warbler, as Acanthopneuste occipitalis ijimae, Yamashina Yoshimaro following suit in 1935. In 1938, Claud Ticehurst treated the warbler as a "race" of the eastern crowned warbler (Phylloscopus coronatus), as did Allan Robert Phillips in 1947, based on three specimens from the southern part of Okinawa Island, the combination being Phylloscopus coronatus ijimae. In 1953, citing differences in songs and nesting behaviours, Oliver L. Austin and Kuroda Nagahisa elevated the warbler to specific rank, with the binomial Phylloscopus ijimae, a treatment followed the next year by Charles Vaurie Kenneth Williamson treated the warbler as a subspecies of the pale-legged leaf warbler, under the combination Phylloscopus tenellipes ijimae; however, due to differences in its vocalizations, nesting preferences, and DNA, the warbler has again been elevated to species rank, as Phylloscopus ijimae. The specific name honours Ijima Isao, for his contributions to Japanese ornithology.

Description

The crown and nape are a greenish-grey, upperparts a bright olive green, flanks greyish, and underparts white. It has a long white or buffish-white supercilium, blackish eyestripe, and dark brown iris. The beak is relatively long and "broad-based", the upper mandible dark brown, the lower yellowish, and the legs and feet a pinkish brown.

The warbler is similar in appearance to the eastern crowned warbler (Phylloscopus coronatus), from which it may be distinguished visually by the absence of a central stripe on its crown and by its paler yellow undertail coverts. Its song and calls, which include "swss, swss, swss", "swee-swee-swee-swee-swee", "shwee-it, shweet, shweet, shweet", and a soft "se-chui, se-chui, se-chui" and "phi-phi-phi", also differ from those of the eastern crowned warbler.

Distribution and habitat
Ijima's leaf warbler breeds in the summer in the Izu Islands, from Izu Ōshima to Aogashima, and also on Nakanoshima in the Tokara Islands. In the spring and autumn, there are records of its presence from Honshū (Shizuoka, Aichi, and Wakayama prefectures), Mizunoko-jima, Tanegashima, Yakushima, and Okinawa Island and the Yaeyama Islands in the Ryūkyūs. Its wintering grounds are poorly understood; a small number may overwinter in the Izu Islands (Miyake-jima and Hachijō-jima) and Ryūkyū Islands, while there are also records from Taiwan and Luzon in the northern Philippines. It inhabits the "lowland deciduous and mixed subtropical evergreen forest" and laurel forest, including the forest edge, stands of alder (Alnus) and bamboo, and shrubland.

Ecology
Insects form the principal component of its diet — when written in kanji (飯島虫喰), the warbler's Japanese name reads as "Ijima's insect-eater" — which also includes seeds. For these it forages, singly or in small groups (sometimes including other species, in particular long-tailed tits (Aegithalos caudatus)), on lower branches, in the forest canopy, and on the ground, and it may also take prey in mid-air.

The breeding season is from April to June or July. The clutch size ranges from two to four eggs, with three or four the most common.

Conservation
The declining population, thought to total fewer than 10,000 individuals, is threatened by habitat loss and fragmentation. In addition, the availability of prey may be impacted by the use of pesticides. The species was badly affected by the eruption of Miyake-jima in 2000.

With an estimated 3% of the global population, Phylloscopus ijimae is included on the 2016 Red List of Birds of Taiwan with the status "vulnerable". (The species is also included on the 2016 Red List of China's Vertebrates (with the vernacular name 日本冕柳莺), with the status "near threatened".) In the Philippines, the species is included on the National List of Threatened Fauna, as a migrant bird on Luzon, with the status "vulnerable". On the 2020 Japanese Ministry of the Environment Red List, Phylloscopus ijimae has the status "vulnerable", as it had done also on the 1998 and 2007 editions.

See also

 List of birds of Japan
 List of Red Lists

References

External links

BirdLife Species Factsheet

Phylloscopus
Birds described in 1892
Taxa named by Leonhard Stejneger
Birds of Japan
Birds of Taiwan
Birds of the Philippines
Natural monuments of Japan
Taxonomy articles created by Polbot